Major Harold Thomas Forster DSO and Bar, MC and Bar (14 November 1878 – 29 May 1918) was a British career soldier. He first served in the Royal Marines Light Infantry in the late 19th century before joining the British Army where he served in the ranks of the Royal Berkshire Regiment. By the outbreak of the First World War he was a company sergeant major. Repeatedly decorated during the war he was commissioned, continuing to serve with the Royal Berkshires until 1918. He then transferred to the 2nd Battalion, Northamptonshire Regiment as second-in-command. At the time of his death, he was acting commanding officer following the earlier death of the battalion's lieutenant-colonel.

Forster was also a keen sportsman and played a season of first-class cricket for Hampshire County Cricket Club in 1911. He was a left-handed batsman who bowled left-arm slow-medium.

Army career
Forster was born at St Faith, Winchester, Hampshire on 14 November 1878. His service record shows that he served with the Royal Marines Light Infantry from 1897 to 1899. Having bought himself out, he then re-enlisted in the Royal Berkshire Regiment. He progressed through the ranks, and by the outbreak of the First World War was a company sergeant major in 1st Battalion, Royal Berkshires. His battalion was sent to France as part of the British Expeditionary Force, he is recorded as first entering a theatre of war on 13 August 1914.

Forster was commissioned on 25 June 1915, and posted to the 2nd Battalion. He was promoted lieutenant on 28 December 1915. On 15 June 1916 Forster was Mentioned in Despatches, and on 19 August 1916 he was awarded the Military Cross for distinguished conduct in the field while still a CSM, the citation read:

He was appointed battalion adjutant on 22 October 1916. He received a further Mention on 25 May 1917. The award of the Distinguished Service Order was gazetted on 26 September 1917, as was the Bar to his MC, He was again Mentioned in Despatches on 21 December 1917. The citations for the DSO and Bar to the MC followed on 9 January 1918:

In April 1918 he was attached to 2nd Battalion, Northamptonshire Regiment as an acting major and second-in-command. He assumed command of the battalion when the lieutenant-colonel was presumed killed on 24 April. Forster himself was killed in action at Bouleuse Ridge, near Ventelay, Marne on 29 May 1918, he was initially only reported missing, and it took until 23 March 1919 for his death to be confirmed. He is buried at Terlincthun British Cemetery, Wimille.

On 16 September 1918 he was belatedly awarded a Bar to his DSO for the first few days of his command of 2nd Northants, the citation read:

Cricket career

Forster made his first-class debut for Hampshire 1911 against the Marylebone Cricket Club, where on debut he took 5/38 in the Marylebone Cricket Club's first innings, claiming figures of 9/92 in the match. Forster played five first-class matches for Hampshire in 1911, with his final first-class appearance coming against Gloucestershire. In his five first-class matches Forster took ten wickets at an average of 21.20. This was Forster's only season in first-class cricket.

During his army career, Forster also played hockey for battalion sides.

References

External links
[A HERO OF THE GREAT WAR] by one of Harold Forster's grandsons.http://www.alfo.pwp.blueyonder.co.uk/htforster.htm
Harold Forster at CricketArchive

1878 births
1918 deaths
Military personnel from Winchester
English cricketers
Hampshire cricketers
British military personnel killed in World War I
British Army personnel of World War I
Royal Berkshire Regiment officers
Northamptonshire Regiment officers
Recipients of the Military Cross
Companions of the Distinguished Service Order
Royal Marines ranks
19th-century Royal Marines personnel